The Vulgar Hours is a 2011 Brazilian drama film directed by Rodrigo de Oliveira and Victor Graize based on the novel Reino dos Medas, by Reinaldo Santos Neves.

It was shot in black-and-white in Vitória, the capital of Espírito Santo state, in 2011. The film Regular Lovers, directed by Philippe Garrel, served as a reference. The soundtrack was composed by Fabiano Aguilar and consists mostly of jazz.

Plot
Lauro (João Gabriel Vasconcellos) is a young painter taken by an existential malaise. By dawn in the city of Vitoria, he walks and find some friends to say that those are his last hours of life.

Cast 
João Gabriel Vasconcellos as Lauro
Rômulo Braga as Théo
Tayana Dantas as Ana
Higor Campagnaro as Fra
Thaís Simonassi as Clara
Sara Antunes as Júlia
Julia Lund as Erika
Raphael Sil as Negro
Abner Nunes as Eric
Murilo Abreu as Gil

References

External links
 

2011 films
Brazilian black-and-white films
Brazilian drama films
Films based on Brazilian novels
Films shot in Vitória, Espírito Santo
Brazilian independent films
2011 drama films
2011 independent films